Pseudochazara graeca is a species of butterfly in the family Nymphalidae. In Greece it is confined to Mount Parnassus, Mount Olympus, Mount D'rfis, Mount Chelmos, Mount Panakhaikon, Mount Menalon, Mount Mainalo, Mount Taygetus and Katara Pass in the Pindus Mountains. In North Macedonia it is found on Pelister.

Description
graeca Stgr. (44a), from Greece, is still darker and moreover rather considerably smaller than 
the previous forms [ of Pseudochazara mamurra].

Flight period 
The species is univoltine and is on wing from mid-July to late August.

Food plants
Larvae feed on grasses.

Subspecies
Pseudochazara graeca graeca Mount Parnassos, Mount Timfrstos
Pseudochazara graeca apollo (Gross, 1978) Mount Chelmos
Pseudochazara graeca coutsis (Brown, 1977) Mount Smolikas, Timfi Mountains and Katara Pass
Pseudochazara graeca pelops (Gross, 1978) Mount Taygetus

References

 Satyrinae of the Western Palearctic - Pseudochazara graeca

Pseudochazara
Butterflies described in 1870
Butterflies of Europe
Taxa named by Otto Staudinger